Saemi Nakamura is a Japanese American actress best known for playing Kimiko Nakamura in the NBC science fiction television drama series Heroes. She also appeared in a minor part in the 1995 film Jury Duty and The Truman Show in 1998.

External links

American television actresses
Actresses from Tokyo
Japanese emigrants to the United States
Living people
Year of birth missing (living people)
American actresses of Japanese descent
21st-century American women